Audio Diaries was a short-lived radio program that aired from 1998–2001.  There were 15 half-hour episodes and it was broadcast on BBC Radio 4.  It was written by Kay Stonham and produced by Jane Berthoud.

Notes and references
Lavalie, John. Audio Diaries. EpGuides. 21 Jul 2005. 29 Jul 2005  <https://web.archive.org/web/20090421053520/http://epguides.com/AudioDiaries/%3E.

BBC Radio 4 programmes